Bishopstone Beach Halt was a railway station in East Sussex, England that was opened on 1 June 1864 and closed on 1 January 1942. The station was built on the Seaford Branch Line for residents of the Bishopstone and Tide Mills villages and located on the west side of Mill Drove.  The company that operated the trains on opening was the London Brighton & South Coast Railway, later merged into the Southern Railway.

Reasons for construction

The station was built primarily for the 60-100 workers at the mills. After the mills closed 1883 it became used mainly by holiday passengers.

History
The first name of the station was Bishopstone.  It was closed in 1938 when a new Bishopstone station was built  to the east, then reopened in 1939 as Bishopstone Beach Halt.

Present day

The down platform remains intact with no track running through it. The edge stones on the up platform have been removed, but the concrete support of the station sign is still in place.  The station can no longer be visited by the public.

References

Disused railway stations in East Sussex
Former London, Brighton and South Coast Railway stations
Railway stations in Great Britain opened in 1864
Railway stations in Great Britain closed in 1938
Railway stations in Great Britain opened in 1939
Railway stations in Great Britain closed in 1942